Pyrrholaemus is a genus of birds in the family Acanthizidae.

The genus was introduced by the English ornithologist and bird artist John Gould in 1841. The name Pyrrholaemus is from classical Greek purrhos meaning "flame-coloured" or "red" and laimos for "throat".

The genus contains two species:
 Redthroat (Pyrrholaemus brunneus)
 Speckled warbler (Pyrrholaemus sagittatus)

References

 
Bird genera
Taxonomy articles created by Polbot